Eupithecia tenoensis is a moth in the family Geometridae. It is found in the Region of Maule (Curico Province) in Chile. The habitat consists of either the Central Valley or the Northern Valdivian Forest biotic provinces.

The length of the forewings is about 8 mm for males. The forewings are pale brownish grey. The hindwings are paler than forewings, with some dark scaling along the anal margin. Adults have been recorded on wing in November.

References

Moths described in 1987
tenoensis
Moths of South America
Endemic fauna of Chile